I Stand Alone is the third English-language solo studio album, and tenth overall, by Swedish singer and ABBA member Agnetha Fältskog. Released on 9 November 1987, the album was produced by Peter Cetera and would be her last for 17 years.

Overview
Recorded mainly in Los Angeles and Malibu, California, I Stand Alone was produced by Peter Cetera, the former singer and bass guitar player with American rock band Chicago. He duetted with Fältskog on the track "I Wasn't the One (Who Said Goodbye)". The co-producer of the album was Bruce Gaitsch, with whom Fältskog was in a relationship at the time. 

Fältskog made a very rare trip on an airplane to Los Angeles to record the album. After it was completed, she did not fly again for years due to her much-publicised fear of flying. She did, however, admit that the flight was worth it. The resulting musical style of the album was very different from the European sounds of Faltskog's previous two albums, and reflected the West Coast American influences of the producers. 

Album track "Love in a World Gone Mad" was a cover version of a song by British pop group Bucks Fizz, from their 1986 album Writing on the Wall.

Fältskog also made several promo videos for singles from the album, including "The Last Time" and "Let It Shine". When the third single, "I Wasn't the One (Who Said Goodbye)", appeared on the US Billboard Hot 100 in April 1988, Warner Music asked her to make another video immediately. Although it was a duet with Peter Cetera, he did not appear in the video.

For the cover of the album and promotional interviews, Fältskog appeared with a "new" spiky blonde hair look.

Estoy Sola
The album was re-released as Estoy Sola for the Latin American market on LP and cassette in 1987. Although all of the original English language song titles were translated into Spanish for the album's track listing, only two songs were actually re-recorded with Fältskog and Cetera recording new vocals in Spanish for "I Wasn't the One (Who Said Goodbye)" (as "Yo No Fui Quién Dijo Adiós") and "The Last Time" (as "La Ultima Véz").

Reception
Upon its release, Music & Media picked I Stand Alone as their "Album of the Week". The magazine described the album as a "goldmine of hit singles" and noted its "crystalline production" and "stunningly good songwriting in 'Adult Contemporary' vein". Cash Box noted: "Faltskog shines on this Peter Cetera-produced project."

The album became Sweden's best-selling LP of 1988, where it remained at No. 1 for eight weeks. It also reached the Top 20 in Norway and the Netherlands, but fared less well on charts elsewhere, only reaching No. 47 in West Germany, No. 72 in the United Kingdom, No. 93 in Japan and No. 96 in Australia. "I Wasn't the One (Who Said Goodbye)" became Fältskog's second entry on the Billboard Hot 100 reaching No. 93. It also reached No. 19 on the Adult Contemporary chart in the US.

The album was picked as a "Lost Treasure" by the Smashing Pumpkins' frontman Billy Corgan. "She's one of my favourite singers of all time", he explained. "It's rare that a singer can hit super-high up the register and sound really good. When I look at the pop world today, I wish we had an ABBA. They had that right combination of fun, beauty, not taking it too seriously, but being deadly in the studio. Everyone's so goddamn serious these days."

Track listing

I Stand Alone
Side one
"The Last Time" – 4:12 (Robin Randall, Judithe Randall, Jeff Law)
"Little White Secrets" – 4:04 (Ellen Schwartz, Roger Bruno, Susan Pomerantz)
"I Wasn't the One (Who Said Goodbye)" with Peter Cetera – 4:10 (Mark Mueller, Aaron Zigman)
"Love in a World Gone Mad" – 4:08 (Billy Livsey, Pete Sinfield)
"Maybe It Was Magic" – 4:07 (Peter Brown, Pat Hurley)
Side two
"Let It Shine" – 3:58 (Austin Roberts, Bill LaBounty, Beckie Foster)
"We Got a Way" – 3:50 (John Robinson, Franne Golde, Martin Walsh)
"I Stand Alone" – 4:48 (Peter Cetera, Bruce Gaitsch)
"Are You Gonna Throw It All Away" – 4:52 (Diane Warren, Albert Hammond) 
"If You Need Somebody Tonight" – 3:32 (Diane Warren, Albert Hammond)

Estoy Sola
Side one
"La Última Vez" ("The Last Time") – 4:12
"Pequeños Secretos Blancos" ("Little White Secrets") – 4:04
"Yo No Fui Quien Dijo Adiós" with Peter Cetera ("I Wasn't the One (Who Said Goodbye)") – 4:10
"Amor En Un Mundo Vuelto Loco" ("Love In a World Gone Mad") – 4:08
"Tal Vez Eso Era Mágico" ("Maybe It Was Magic") – 4:07
Side two
"Déjalo Que Brille" ("Let It Shine") – 3:58
"Tenemos Un Modo" ("We Got a Way") – 3:50
"Estoy Sola" ("I Stand Alone") – 4:48
"¿Vas A Abandonarlo Todo?" ("Are You Gonna Throw It All Away") – 4:52
"Si Necesitas A Alguien Esta Noche" ("If You Need Somebody Tonight") – 3:32

Personnel

Musicians 
 Agnetha Fältskog – lead and backing vocals 
 Robbie Buchanan – pianos, synthesizers, bells, whistle 
 Randy Waldman – pianos, synthesizers 
 Bruce Gaitsch – synthesizer programming, guitars
 Neil Stubenhaus – bass
 John Robinson – drums 
 Paulinho da Costa – percussion
 Dave Boruff – saxophone 
 Tommy Morgan – harmonica
 Kenny Cetera – backing vocals 
 Peter Cetera – backing vocals, lead vocals (3)
 Linda Harmon – backing vocals
 Darlene Koldenhoven – backing vocals

Production and Technical 
 Produced by Peter Cetera and Bruce Gaitsch
 Engineered and mixed by Rick Holbrook
 Assistant engineer – Britt Bacon
 Mix assistant – Karen Siegel
 Recorded at Chartmaker Studios (Malibu, California)
 Additional recording at Skyline Recording (Topanga Canyon, California), That Studio (North Hollywood, California), Sun Valley Audio (Sun Valley, Idaho) and Zebra Studio (Studio City, California)
 Mixed at Lion Share Recording Studio (Los Angeles, California)
 Mastered by Wally Traugott at Capitol Mastering (Hollywood, California)
 Production coordination – Ivy Skoff
 Art direction – Greta for Ink-a-Dinka, Inc.
 Photography – Albert Tolot

Charts

References

External links
 I Stand Alone – Agnetha Fältskog official website entry

Agnetha Fältskog albums
1987 albums